"Salt Lake City" is a song written by Brian Wilson and Mike Love for the American rock band The Beach Boys. It was released on their 1965 album Summer Days (And Summer Nights!!).

Background

"Salt Lake City" was written to call attention to the band's major fan base in the city of the same name.  From 1963 until 1973, The Beach Boys performed at Utah's Lagoon Amusement Park's Patio Gardens at least twelve times, and Utah was one of the earliest places that The Beach Boys' music was played outside of California. KNAK deejay Gene Davis said, "[Brian Wilson] remembered coming to Salt Lake, but it was not a big deal. When you talk to Mike Love, Salt Lake was big time to them. He loved Salt Lake City. But [Wilson] remembered writing 'Salt Lake City' as one of those fun songs they sat down and did." The song was also released as a promo single, backed with "Amusement Parks U.S.A.", by the city's downtown merchants association.

The song lyrics extol the attractions of northern Utah: summer sun, winter skiing, local girls and the Lagoon amusement park. Mike Love and Brian Wilson sing the leads vocals on the song.

Critical opinion

AllMusic writer Richie Unterberger called the song a "subpar effort" as well as one of the "throwbacks to the empty-headed summer filler of previous days" on Summer Days (and Summer Nights!!). Author Jim Fuselli described the track as a throwback "to the group's happy-go-lucky days."

Personnel
Partial credits via Craig Slowinski.

The Beach Boys
Al Jardine – harmony and backing vocals
Mike Love – lead and bass vocals
Brian Wilson – lead, harmony, and backing vocals
Carl Wilson – harmony and backing vocals, electric guitar
Dennis Wilson – harmony and backing vocals
Additional musicians and staff
Hal Blaine – drums
Leon Russell – Hammond B-3 organ
Frank Capp – vibraphone
Roy Caton – trumpet
Jerry Cole – electric rhythm guitar
Al De Lory – grand piano
Steve Douglas – tenor saxophone
Plas Johnson – tenor saxophone
Jay Migliori – baritone saxophone
Carol Kaye – Danelectro 6-string bass guitar
Lyle Ritz – upright bass
Howard Roberts – 12-string electric guitar
Billy Strange – tambourine

References

1965 songs
The Beach Boys songs
Songs written by Brian Wilson
Songs written by Mike Love
Song recordings produced by Brian Wilson
Song recordings with Wall of Sound arrangements
Songs about cities in the United States
Songs about Utah